Christine ǁHoebes is a Namibian politician serving as Namibia's minister of presidential affairs since 21 March 2020.

Early life and education
ǁHoebes was born in Okombahe but grew up in Witvlei. She attended school in Witvlei, Gobabis and Windhoek, and then completed a Basic Education Teacher Diploma at the Windhoek College of Education in 2001. She  pursues distance education degrees at the University of South Africa and the University of Namibia.

Political career
ǁHoebes entered politics at the age of 23 when she became councillor of Witvlei. She was elected chairperson of the village council and was at that time the youngest mayor in Namibia.

ǁHoebes entered cabinet in 2015 as deputy of the minister of presidential affairs. In a cabinet reshuffle in February 2018 ǁHoebes was moved from presidential affairs to foreign affairs, again as deputy minister. On 21 March 2020 she was appointed minister of presidential affairs.

References

Date of birth missing (living people)
Living people
People from Erongo Region
21st-century Namibian women politicians
Women members of the National Assembly (Namibia)
Members of the National Assembly (Namibia)
SWAPO politicians
Windhoek College of Education alumni
Year of birth missing (living people)
21st-century Namibian politicians